Kipipiri Constituency is an electoral constituency in Kenya. It is one of five constituencies in Nyandarua County. The constituency has four wards, all of which elect MCAs for the Nyandarua County. The constituency was established for the 1988 elections. The constituency borders Olkalou, Kinangop and Gilgil Constituencies. The inhabitants of the constituency are largely of Kikuyu extraction. Its biggest town is Miharati, which acts as the subcounty headquarters. The constituency is largely poor, with a poverty index of below the national average. The main activity for the residents is farming, with cabbages, Irish potatoes, milk, carrots, and onions being the main products. It has poor roads, and receives rainfall for a large part of the year, save for the lower areas bordering Gilgil that are dry.

Members of Parliament 

|-
|2022 || Wanjiku Muhia || UDA ||
|}

Wards

References

External links 

Constituencies in Nyandarua County
Constituencies in Central Province (Kenya)
1988 establishments in Kenya
Constituencies established in 1988